Héctor Grauert (1907–1991) was a Uruguayan political figure.

Background

He was a lawyer by profession. His brother Julio César Grauert was a Colorado Party Deputy.

Public offices

He was elected a Deputy in 1942 and subsequently a Senator.

He served as Interior Minister and in other ministries in the 1950s.

In the early 1960s he served as minority member at the National Council of Government of Uruguay.

See also
 Politics of Uruguay
 List of political families

References
 :es:Héctor Grauert

Interior ministers of Uruguay
Ministers of Labor and Social Affairs of Uruguay
Uruguayan people of German descent
National Council of Government (Uruguay)
People from Montevideo
1907 births
1991 deaths
Grauert
Members of the Senate of Uruguay
Grand Crosses 1st class of the Order of Merit of the Federal Republic of Germany